The 1995 European Youth Summer Olympic Days was the third edition of multi-sport event for European youths between the ages of 12 and 18. It was held at the University of Bath, United Kingdom from 9 to 14 July 1995. A total of ten sports were contested.

Sports

Medal table

References

Bell, Daniel (2003). Encyclopedia of International Games. McFarland and Company, Inc. Publishers, Jefferson, North Carolina. .
Medal table
Tableau des médailles Bath - Grande Bretagne (1995). French Olympic Committee. Retrieved on 2014-11-23.

 
1995
1995 in multi-sport events
1995 in European sport
1995 in English sport
Multi-sport events in the United Kingdom
International sports competitions hosted by the University of Bath
Youth sport in the United Kingdom
July 1995 sports events in the United Kingdom
Sports competitions in Somerset
1990s in Somerset